Kinjite: Forbidden Subjects is a 1989 American action thriller film starring Charles Bronson and directed by J. Lee Thompson. As Thompson's final film, it was the last project he and Bronson did together—a long and famed Hollywood collaboration. The word "kinjite" (禁じて) translates to English as "forbidden move", hinting at the subject matter.

The movie marks the ninth and final collaboration between Bronson and director J. Lee Thompson. Beginning with the movie St. Ives in 1976, their partnership spanned nearly thirteen years.

Plot
Hiroshi Hada, a Japanese businessman in a troubled marriage, sees a woman being groped in a crowded Tokyo subway. He is fascinated by the fact that she moans silently, involuntarily orgasms, but does not cry out or let people know she is being sexually molested. When Hada is transferred to Los Angeles, he has too much to drink at a business party and tries to imitate what he saw by groping a Caucasian school girl while riding a crowded bus. But unlike the Japanese woman that Hada saw in Japan, the American girl screams. Hada runs away, but is robbed and beaten by a mugger. Meanwhile, several innocent Asian men are beaten by bystanders who suspect that one of them is the man who groped the girl.

The girl happens to be Rita Crowe, the daughter of an LAPD vice-squad detective, Lt. Crowe (Bronson), an officer with a strong sense of justice who is very protective of her. Shortly afterward, Fumiko, Hada's daughter, is kidnapped into a child prostitution ring led by the infamous "Pimp King" Duke. Crowe, who has developed a general dislike of the Japanese due to his daughter's incident, is assigned against his will to find the girl. His feelings about Japanese people start to change when he realizes that the Hadas care about their daughter as intensely as he cares for his daughter.

Crowe and his partner, Eddie Rios, eventually find Fumiko and rescue her from the pimp and his gang. They kill one member of the gang, but the others escape. The Hadas visit Crowe's house with gifts to show their appreciation for his work. Rita recognizes Hiroshi as the man who groped her on the bus—and he recognizes her—but neither one says anything. However, despite this apparently happy ending, Fumiko has been so traumatized by her experiences as a prostitute—she was raped by Duke and his gang members and then sold to customers of both sexes—that she commits suicide by an overdose.

Crowe and Rios decide to find Duke, and locate him on a boat in a harbor. In the ensuing fight, Duke and his remaining gang members kill Rios, but Duke eventually ends up in the harbor. Since Duke can't swim, Crowe has the option to let the gangster drown, but ends up dragging him out. However, as a way of "poetic justice", Crowe has Duke interred in a prison wing inhabited by sexually aggressive inmates; his designated cellmate makes several sexual allusions, leading Duke to realize that he is intent on raping him. As Duke screams in anguish, Crowe walks away in deep satisfaction.

Cast

 Charles Bronson as Lieutenant Crowe
 Perry Lopez as Detective Eddie Rios
 Juan Fernández as "Duke"
 James Pax as Hiroshi Hada
 Peggy Lipton as Kathleen Crowe
 Sy Richardson as Lavonne
 Marion Kodama Yue as Karuko Hada
 Bill McKinney as Father Burke
 Gerald Castillo as Captain Tovar
 Nicole Eggert as DeeDee
 Amy Hathaway as Rita Crowe
 Kumiko Hayakawa as Fumiko Hada
 Michelle Wong as Setsuko Hada
 Sam Chew Jr. as McLane
 Danny Trejo as Prisoner Inmate

Production
Filming started in June 1988. It was one of a number of movies made in Hollywood with Japanese themes around this time, others including Collision Course and Black Rain. The movie was meant to be shot back to back with The Golem which was to have the same star (Bronson), producer (Kohner) and director (Thompson) as Kinjite but that film was not made.

Bronson said the film was "a little more interesting than most I've been offered" because of its culture clash element. "It's from the point of view of a policeman who never read a business page in his life," Bronson said, "but he can see what's happening and he's not sure he likes it or understands it.. I keep looking desperately for scripts that haven't been done dozens of times before. I think guys keep writing from what they see on TV, copying what's already there."

The film was the ninth Bronson had made with J. Lee Thompson. The star preferred Thompson to Michael Winner, calling the latter "brazen when he's working in a street. He takes it over and he doesn't care about complaints. But it's tough shooting with him. He demands three takes of every shot and, if it's hard running or some other action, it gets to you. J. Lee only demands two."

Reception

Critical response
The Los Angeles Times said called the movie "a pretty odd, murky stew. If you think you might be offended by it, don't go. You will be. Thompson has always had an evil sense of humor, and the movie repeatedly crosses the line between dramatizing a situation and exploiting it, exposing racism or moral rot and almost indulging in it. But the disturbance you feel in watching "Kinjite" doesn't just come because it has a sordid subject, some bad scenes or a heavy cargo of shock and sleaze, but because it leaves us, much of the time, with no moral anchor."

References

External links

1989 films
1989 action thriller films
American police detective films
Golan-Globus films
American action thriller films
Films directed by J. Lee Thompson
American rape and revenge films
Films about prostitution
Films about child abduction in the United States
Films about child prostitution
Films about human trafficking
Works about sex trafficking
1980s English-language films
1980s American films